Anish Deb (22 October 1951 – 28 April 2021) was an Indian Bengali writer and academic. He was noted for his writings in the science fiction and thriller genre. He received several literary awards including Vidyasagar Award in 2019.

Early life 
Anish Deb was born in 1951 in Kolkata. He completed his B.Tech. (1974), M.Tech. (1976) and Ph.D. (Tech.) with 1 silver and 2 university gold medals in Applied Physics from the Rajabazar Science College campus of University of Calcutta.

Career 
Anish Deb started his writing career in 1968. He also edited a number of collections of popular fictions, novels and detective stories.                                                                                                                         Some of his notable writings are: Ghaser Sheesh Nei, Saper Chokh, Teerbiddho, Teish Ghanta Shat Minute, Hate Kalome Computer, Bignyaner Dashdiganto, Jibon Jokhon Phuriye Jay.

Death 
Deb died following COVID-19 in Kolkata on 28 April 2021.

References

External links 
 

Writers from Kolkata
People from Kolkata district
1951 births
2021 deaths
Deaths from the COVID-19 pandemic in India
University of Calcutta alumni
Bengali writers
People from Kolkata
Bengali novelists
Bengali Hindus
21st-century Bengalis
20th-century Bengalis
Bengali-language writers
Indian writers
Indian male writers
Indian novelists
Indian male novelists
20th-century Indian male writers
21st-century Indian male writers
20th-century Indian writers
21st-century Indian writers
20th-century Indian novelists
21st-century Indian novelists
Indian crime fiction writers
Indian science fiction writers
Bengali-language science fiction writers
Bengali detective fiction writers
Indian thriller writers
Indian editors
Indian magazine editors
West Bengal academics